Santa Caterina dello lonio is a town and comune in the province of Catanzaro in the Calabria region of southern Italy.

Geography
The village is bordered by Badolato and Guardavalle.
Santa Caterina dello Ionio is divided into two locations; the Marina, and the upper mountain village, located about 9 km from the coast.
The village of about 2,100 inhabitants in 2013 is along the highway SS 106 Ionica and is located about 50 km from Catanzaro (Roccelletta), 150 km from Reggio Calabria, only 15 km from Riace (where the “Riace Bronzes” were discovered), 8 km from Monasterace (Caulonia) and about 60 km from Locri. Consider visiting the Cliffs of Caminia (along the SS 106); you can enjoy wonderful sights at heights with exceptional views of the breathtaking sea.
Holidays are exceptional, far from crowded beaches. You will be surrounded by white sandy beaches and a beautiful blue sea. It is the site of large marine areas, between coastal towns of the Ionian Sea. There are 3 to 15 km of completely deserted beach with widths from 50 to 150 metres from the shore. The coastline, full of coves, ranges from beaches of white granite sand to rocky coastal cliffs, which are accessible to everyone.

History
Santa Caterina under the colonization of Magna Grecia, the Romans, and finally by the Greek-Byzantine.
The Greeks founded along the coast from the 8th Century. Colonies flourished, but near the sea there was little suitable defense. The Greeks felt the need to unite in a safer and more suitable place for defense of all villages, abandoning the coast because of malaria and Saracen pirate invasions. It is believed that Santa Caterina dello Ionio arose following the Saracen invasions (650-1086 AD), by the union of the colonies in the territory. Originally, it was a small village surrounded by defensive walls, which opened four doors. Only one door "Porta dell'acqua", which translates to "Gateway of the water", remains. Around 1060, Santa Caterina dello Ionio became part of the county of Badolato.
In 1272, the first lord of the village was Rinaldo Conclubet. In 1487, the noble family of Arena of Conclubet was involved with the conspiracy of the Barons. They were overthrown and the town was handed over to Conte Alberico from Barbiano. In the following years, various noble families ruled from Cordova to Galeotta, Gallelli of Badolato, from Gioieni to Colonna. In the seventeenth century, the noble family of Marzano endowed the village with a castle. In 1799, the possession of the territory passed to Di Francia, who held it until the abolition of feudalism.

How to reach the town
Once you arrive at the Lamezia Terme International Airport or train station, decide whether to rent a car or use the various private transfer services., by travelling along the highway A3 Salerno - Reggio Calabria, exit Lamezia Terme - Catanzaro. Continue along the S.S. 280 (E848) towards Catanzaro.

What to do
Restaurants
Bars and Pubs
Go to the Beach
Santa Caterina is ideal for holidays as you will surrounded by white sandy beaches and a beautiful blue sea. It is the site of large marine areas, between coastal towns of the Ionian Sea. There are 3 to 15 km of completely deserted beach with widths from 50 to 150 metres from the shore. The coastline, full of coves, ranges from beaches of white granite sand to rocky coastal cliffs, which are accessible to everyone. The beaches have free access for swimming and the Lidi provide services such as Restaurants, Bars, Pizzerias, Discos and hire of beach chairs and umbrellas. The beauty of the sea and the coast in this area is pristine.

Accommodation
Vacation rentals and Bed and Breakfast

Notes and references

Cities and towns in Calabria